Philosophical consultancy, also sometimes called philosophical practice or philosophical counseling or clinical philosophy, is a contemporary movement in practical philosophy.  Developing since the 1980s as a profession but since the 1950s as a practice, practitioners of philosophical counseling ordinarily have a doctorate or minimally a master's degree in philosophy and offer their philosophical counseling or consultation services to clients who look for a philosophical understanding of their lives, social problems, or even mental problems. In the last case, philosophical counseling might be in lieu of, or in conjunction with, psychotherapy. The movement has often been said to be rooted in the Socratic tradition, which viewed philosophy as a search for the Good and the good life. A life without philosophy was not worth living for Socrates. This led to the philosophy of Stoicism, for example, resulting in Stoic therapy.

Philosophical practice has continued to expand and is attractive as an alternative to counselling and psychotherapy for those who prefer to avoid a medicalization of life problems. Numerous philosophical consultants have emerged and there is a strong international interest and a bi-annual international conference.

History 
Peter Koestenbaum at San Jose State University in California was an early figure in philosophical counseling. His 1978 book The New Image of the Person: The Theory and Practice of Clinical Philosophy set out the essential contributions of philosophy to counseling. His own practice was augmented by extensive training of mental health professionals in applications of philosophical principles.

Gerd B. Achenbach and Ad Hoogendijk are two German and Dutch philosophers who established themselves as consultant philosophers in the 1980s and led the way to a number of other developments all over the world. They proposed an alternative to psychotherapeutic culture by working exclusively within the field of existential investigation with clients or patients, whom they called 'visitors'.

The world's oldest association of philosophical counseling and practice appears to be the German Society for Philosophical Practice and Counseling, which was founded in 1982 by Achenbach. In the United States, the oldest association of philosophical counseling and practice appears to be the National Philosophical Counseling Association (NPCA), formerly called the American Society for Philosophy, Counseling, and Psychotherapy, which was co-founded in 1992 by three American philosophers, Elliot D. Cohen, Paul Sharkey, and Thomas Magnell. The NPCA offers a primary certificate in logic-based therapy (LBT) through the Institute of Critical Thinking.

The movement is also connected with and related to existential therapy, which has thrived in the United Kingdom since the establishment of the Society for Existential Analysis (SEA) in London in 1988. This was based on the work of Emmy van Deurzen, also a philosopher who has applied philosophical thinking to the practice of psychotherapy. Philosophical consultancy is often applied to business consultancy as well as to individuals, as it frequently involves a rethinking of values and beliefs and is also a method for rational conflict resolution.

Pierre Grimes founded the Noetic Society in 1967 for the study of dialogue and dialectic. He became the head of the Philosophical Midwifery Program when the Noetic Society was incorporated in 1978.
 
The American Philosophical Practitioners Association (APPA) was founded in 1998 in New York City by Lou Marinoff.  APPA offers a certification program in client counseling for those with advanced degrees in philosophy who wish to practice philosophical counseling.  It also publishes a professional Journal and has a membership list of those certified as philosophical counselors on its website. Marinoff was at the center of a 2004 controversy when his philosophical counseling practice at City College of New York was temporarily shuttered by college officials who feared he was offering mental health advice without proper training and licensing; Marinoff responded by suing for what he described as his freedom of speech being stifled.

Philosophical practice has continued to expand and is attractive as an alternative to counselling and psychotherapy for those who prefer to avoid a medicalization of life problems. Numerous philosophical consultants have emerged and there is a strong international interest and a bi-annual international conference. There are a number of important publications in the field. There are presently a number of professional associations for philosophical counseling throughout the world.

In India an academic course in philosophical counselling is offered by the Department of Philosophy, Panjab University, Chandigarh and the University of Kerala. In 2020, a project in philosophical counseling in India was awarded by the Ministry of Education to the Department of Philosophy, Panjab University, Chandigarh.

In 2021, a movement related to philosophical counseling started in Bangladesh too. Bangladeshi philosopher, researcher Morsalin Islam Shouradip began this movement by working as philosophical counselor.

Goals and methods
Philosophical consultancy is a relatively new movement in philosophy that applies philosophical thinking and debating to the resolution of a person's problem. Achenbach argues that it is life that calls to thinking, rather than thinking that informs life. The act of philosophising can, therefore, give direction in its own right, as living precedes thinking and practice precedes theory.

According to the Preamble of the NPCA Standards of Practice,
a philosophical practitioner helps clients to clarify, articulate, explore and comprehend philosophical aspects of their belief systems or world views. ... Clients may consult philosophical practitioners for help in exploring philosophical problems related to such matters as mid-life crises, career changes, stress, emotions, assertiveness, physical illness, death and dying, aging, meaning of life, and morality. On the other side philosophical practitioners also initiate projects in common life worlds with various goals that are related to essential problems of life, such as sustainable energy, direct democracy, etc. 
Activities common to philosophical practice include:
 the examination of clients' arguments and justifications
 the clarification, analysis, and definition of important terms and concepts
 the exposure and examination of underlying assumptions and logical implications
 the exposure of conflicts and inconsistencies
 the exploration of traditional philosophical theories and their significance for client issues
 the initiation of projects for common goods 
 all other related activities that have historically been identified as philosophical.

Variations
The methods and orientations of philosophical counselors vary greatly. Some practitioners, such as Gerd B. Achenbach (Germany), Michel Weber (Belgium) and Shlomit C. Schuster (Israel) are dialogical and dialective engaged, while confessing to a "beyond method" approach. They hold that philosophical counseling has the aim to empower clients' philosophical abilities, which additionally may have therapeutic implications. Other practitioners are more directive and view philosophical counseling as a form of mental health intervention.

Some philosophical practitioners, notably Louis Marinoff (U.S.) and Guenther Witzany (Austria), view philosophical practice as a separate practice area distinct from mental health practices such as psychology and mental health counseling; while others, notably Elliot D. Cohen (U.S.), think they are necessarily intertwined. Some philosophical counselors draw inspiration from the anti-psychiatry movement, arguing that widespread mental health diagnostic criteria as outlined in DSM IV have unfairly or inaccurately pathologized humanity.

According to a New York Times article on philosophical counseling, "only Cohen and Marinoff have branded easily comprehended techniques. Cohen's logic-based therapy builds on the work of his mentor Albert Ellis, who invented rational emotive behavior therapy."

References

Further reading 

 Achenbach, G. B. (1984) Philosophische Praxis, Köln: Verlag für Philosophie Jürgen Dinter.
 Achenbach, G.B. (2002) Philosophical Practice opens up the trace to Lebenskönnerschaft, in Herrestad H., Holt A., Svare H. Philosophy in Society, Oslo: Unipub Forlag.
 
Deurzen, E. van (1984) Existential psychotherapy, in W Dryden (ed.) Individual Therapy in Britain, London: Harper and Row.
Deurzen, E. van (1988) Existential Counselling in Practice, London: Sage Publications.
Deurzen, E. van (1991) Ontological insecurity revisited, Journal of the Society for Existential Analysis 2: 38-48.
Deurzen, E. van (1992) Dialogue as therapy, Journal of the Society for Existential Analysis 3: 15-23.
Deurzen, E. van (1994x) Does Counselling Help?, Durham: Durham University Publications.
Deurzen, E. van (1994c) If Truth were a Woman, London: School of Psychotherapy and Counselling Publications.
Deurzen, E. van 1998) Paradox and Passion in Psychotherapy, Chichester: Wiley.
Deurzen, E. van (2002) Existential Counselling and Psychotherapy in Practice, Second Edition, London: Sage Publications.
Hall, R. (2021) Secundum Naturam (According to Nature), Stoic Therapy, LLC.
Herrestad H., Holt A., Svare H. (2002) Philosophy in Society, Oslo: Unipub Forlag.
Hoogendijk, A. (1988) Spreekuur bij een filosoof, Utrecht: Veers.
Lahav, R. and Tillmanns, M. da V. (eds) (1995) Essays in Philosophical Counselling, Lanham, MD: University Press of America.
LeBon, T. (2001) Wise Therapy, London: Continuum.
Marinoff, L. (1999) Plato not Prozac, New York: Harper Collins.
Rochelle, G. (2012) Doing Philosophy, Edinburgh, Dunedin.
Weiss, M. N., (ed.) (2015) The Socratic Handbook - Dialogue Methods for Philosophical Practice, Vienna: LIT.

 
Philosophy education